John Sebastian Farrell (December 4, 1876 – May 13, 1921), was a professional baseball player who played infielder in the American Major Leagues from -. He would play for the St. Louis Cardinals and Washington Senators.

External links

1876 births
1921 deaths
Major League Baseball infielders
Baseball players from Kentucky
St. Louis Cardinals players
Washington Senators (1901–1960) players
Winston-Salem Blue Sluggers players
Petersburg Farmers players
Roanoke Magicians players
Indianapolis Hoosiers (minor league) players
Springfield Governors players
New Castle Quakers players
Kansas City Blues (baseball) players
Indianapolis Indians players
Altoona Mountaineers players
Sportspeople from Covington, Kentucky